The  is a Japanese football (soccer) competition organized by J.League. It has been sponsored by Yamazaki Biscuits (YBC) of Yamazaki Baking (formerly Yamazaki Nabisco) since its inception in 1992.

It is generally regarded as the Japanese equivalent to league cup competitions played in many countries, such as the Football League Cup in England, as complementary to the Emperor's Cup competed between clubs from all divisions of professional football in Japan. Before the J. League Cup was created, the old Japan Soccer League had its own Japan Soccer League Cup since the 1976 season.

The tournament format varies almost each year largely depending on the schedule of international matches such as the Olympic Games and World Cup games (see the Format section below).

Since 2007, the winners are qualified for the J.League Cup / Copa Sudamericana Championship held in the following summer.

Format

Early years (1992–1998)
1992
The founding ten clubs of the J. League participated as a warm-up to the upcoming inaugural league season. At the group stage, each team played the other teams once. There was no draw and the golden goal, extra time and penalty shootout was employed to decide a tie if necessary. A sudden death was applied to the penalty shoot-out from the first kicker. The winner of a game got four points. A team who scored two or more goals in a game also won one point. The top four teams of the group stage went on to the knock-out stage where the ties were single matches.
1993
Thirteen teams (the ten J. League sides as well as the three JFL sides who had J. League associate membership) took part. At the group stage, the teams were divided into two groups, one consisting seven and the other consisting six. Each team played the other teams in the same group once. The top two teams of each group were qualified for the knock-out stage where the ties were single matches.
1994
Fourteen teams (the twelve J. League sides as well as the two JFL sides who had J. League associate membership) took part. There was no group stage. The ties were single matches all through the competition.
1995
No competition
1996
The sixteen J. League sides participated. J. League associate member teams did not take part due to the congested schedule. At the group stage, the teams were divided into two groups. Each team played the other teams in the same group twice (home and away). A tie was decided by the aggregate of two matches. The winner of a tie got three points and a draw earned one point. The top two teams of each group were qualified for the knock-out stage where the ties were single matches.
1997
Twenty teams (all the J. League clubs and the JFL clubs with J. League associate membership) participated. At the group stage, the teams were divided into five groups. Each team played the other teams in the same group once. A win earned three points, a draw earned one point. There was no extra time at this stage. The top team of each group, as well as the three second-placed teams with the best records, were qualified for the knock-out stage where the ties were played over two matches (home and away). Although Sagan Tosu had forfeited their associate membership because of the bankruptcy of their forerunner Tosu Futures, they were allowed to enter the competition as a special case.
1998
Twenty teams (all the J. League clubs and the JFL clubs with J. League associate membership) participated. At the group stage, the teams were divided into four groups. Each team played the other teams in the same group once. The top team of each group was qualified for the knock-out stage where the ties were single matches.

As tournaments for J1 and J2 (1999–2001)
1999
All the twenty-six J1 and J2 clubs participated. There was no group stage. The ties were played over two matches (home and away) except the final where the winners were decided by a single game.
2000
All the twenty-seven J1 and J2 clubs participated. There was no group stage. The ties were played over two matches (home and away) except the final where the winners were decided by a single game.
2001
All the twenty-eight J1 and J2 clubs participated. There was no group stage. The ties were played over two matches (home and away) except the final where the winners were decided by a single game.

As tournaments for only J1 (2002–2017)
2002
All the sixteen J1 teams took part. At the group stage, the teams were divided into four groups. Each team played the other teams in the same group twice. The top two teams of the each group were qualified for the knock-out stage where the ties were single matches. 
2003

All the sixteen J1 teams took part. Kashima Antlers and Shimizu S-Pulse were exempted from the group stage because they participated in the AFC Champions League. The remaining fourteen teams were divided into four groups, two groups containing four teams and the other two groups containing three. The top team of the each group and the second placed teams of the groups containing four teams as well as Kashima and Shimizu were qualified for the knock-out stage. The ties were played over two matches (home and away) except the final where the winners were decided by a single game. 
2004
All the sixteen J1 teams took part. At the group stage, the teams were divided into four groups. Each team played the other teams in the same group twice. The top two teams of the each group were qualified for the knock-out stage where the ties were single matches.
2005
All the eighteen J1 teams took part. Yokohama F. Marinos and Jubilo Iwata were exempted from the group stage because they participated in the AFC Champions League. The remaining sixteen teams were divided into four groups. Each team played the other teams in the same group twice. The top team of the each group and the two second-placed teams with the best records as well as Marinos and Iwata were qualified for the knock-out stage. The ties were played over two matches (home and away) except the final where the winners were decided by a single game. From this year's competition, the golden goal rule was abolished and the extra time was always played for thirty minutes. 
2006
All the eighteen J1 teams took part. Gamba Osaka were exempted from the group stage because they participated in the 2006 AFC Champions League. The remaining seventeen teams were divided into four groups, three of them containing four teams and the other containing five teams. Each team played the other teams in the same group twice but only one game was played between some pairs of teams in the group containing five teams. The top team of the each group and the three second placed teams with the best records as well as Gamba Osaka were qualified for the knock-out stage. The ties were played over two matches (home and away) except the final where the winners were decided by a single game. The away goal rule was employed for this year's competition but it was not applied to a goal in the extra time.
2007
The format of the 2007 competition was similar to that of 2006's, but the number of clubs participating from the group stage has been decreased to 16 due to two clubs', Kawasaki Frontale and Urawa Red Diamonds, participation in the 2007 AFC Champions League. See 2007 J. League Cup for details.
2008

The format of the 2008 competition was similar to that of 2007's. See 2008 J. League Cup for details.
2009
The format of the 2009 group stage was changed due to the number of clubs participating 2009 AFC Champions League increased from two to four. 14 remaining clubs were divided into two groups with seven clubs each, then two top clubs of each group were qualified for the knock-out stage. See 2009 J. League Cup for more details.
2010
The format of the 2010 competition was same as that of 2009's. See 2010 J. League Cup for details.
2011
Although the format of the 2011 competition is planned to be same as that of 2009's and 2010's, it was abandoned due to 2011 Tōhoku earthquake and tsunami and replaced by a format without group stage (five knockout stages only). See 2011 J. League Cup for details.
2012–2017
See 2012 J. League Cup, 2013 J. League Cup, 2014 J. League Cup, 2015 J. League Cup, 2016 J. League Cup, and 2017 J.League Cup for details.

As tournaments for J1 and J2 (2018–2023) 

0 to 2 clubs (varies depending on the number of J1 teams participating in the ACL group stage) that were relegated to J2 last year and all J1 clubs can now participate. This is last season of group stage format in 2023.

As tournaments for J1, J2 and J3 (2024–) 

All number of 60 clubs J. League participating in knockout stage format from 2024.

Prizes

 Champions: J. League Cup, YBC Levain Cup, Champion medals and 150 million yen
 Runners-up: J. League Commemorative Plaque, Runner-up medals, and 50 million yen
 3rd place (2 clubs): J. League Commemorative Plaque and 20 million yen to each 3rd placed club

Finals

Performances by team

Most Valuable Players

New Hero Award
This award is presented to an under-23 player who made the biggest contribution to his team in the competition. The winner is decided based on votes from football journalists.

Broadcasters

Japan
All matches of the competition is currently broadcast live by Fuji TV and SKY PerfecTV! respectively

Outside Japan
YouTube only broadcast live coverage in prime stage matches through both official J.League International (exc. Thailand) and Siam Sport (Thailand only) channels.

See also

 Sport in Japan
 Football in Japan
 Japan Football Association (JFA)

References

External links

 
 Japan - List of League Cup Winners, RSSSF.com

J.League Cup
J.League
Football cup competitions in Japan
National association football league cups
Recurring sporting events established in 1992
1992 establishments in Japan